"Put Him Out" is Ms. Dynamite's third and final single from her first album, A Little Deeper It was released on 2 December 2002 a digital download. It reached number 19 in the UK Singles Chart in 2002.

Track listing

Charts performance

Release history

References

External links

Ms. Dynamite songs
2002 singles
2002 songs
Polydor Records singles
Songs written by Ms. Dynamite
Songs written by Christian Karlsson (DJ)
Songs written by Pontus Winnberg
Songs written by Henrik Jonback